Parliamentary elections were held in Portugal on 7 November 1965.

Campaign
Five opposition lists registered to compete in the elections, but four withdrew in protest at a lack of freedom in campaigning. The remaining Social Democrat list called for self-determination in Portuguese colonies in Africa.

Results

References

See also
Politics of Portugal
List of political parties in Portugal
Elections in Portugal

Legislative elections in Portugal
Portugal
1965 elections in Portugal
November 1965 events in Europe